Jana Novotná and Larisa Savchenko were the defending champions but were beaten in the final by Gigi Fernández and Natalia Zvereva, 2–6, 7–5, 6–1.

Seeds
Champion seeds are indicated in bold text while text in italics indicates the round in which those seeds were eliminated.

Draw

Final

Top half

Bottom half

External links
 1993 Volkswagen Cup Doubles draw

Doubles
1993 WTA Tour